Robert Irvine was a New Zealand professional rugby league footballer who played in the 1910s. He played at representative level for New Zealand (Heritage № 77), and Wellington, as a forward (prior to the specialist positions of), during the era of contested scrums.

==Playing career==
Irvine represented New Zealand in 1912 on their tour of Australia.

References

New Zealand national rugby league team players
New Zealand rugby league players
Place of birth missing
Place of death missing
Rugby league forwards
Wellington rugby league team players
Year of birth missing
Year of death missing